Help Wanted is the title of The Chi-Lites' 1998 album.

History
There are twelve tracks on the album and the lead singing alternates between Anthony Watson and Frank Reed. However, group leader, Marshall Thompson sings lead on the opening track, "Hold On To Your Dreams". Connee Thompson was the Executive Producer. The arrangements were by Bruce Thompson and Keith Henderson.

Track listing

References

External links
Help Wanted at Discogs

1998 albums
The Chi-Lites albums